Shuadit (also spelled Chouhadite, Chouhadit, Chouadite, Chouadit, and Shuhadit), also called Judæo-Occitan or less accurately Judæo-Provençal or Judæo-Comtadin, is an extinct Occitan dialect historically spoken by French Jews in the South of France. Though written in Hebrew script, the dialect was mutually intelligible with the Occitan spoken by non-Jews (Banitt 1963, Pansier 1925, Guttel & Aslanov 2006:560).

Shuadit is known from documents dating to as early as the 11th century in France. The language suffered drastic declines beginning with the charter of the Inquisition in France. Shuadit's last known speaker, the writer Armand Lunel, died in 1977.

Literature

Shuadit writings came in two distinct varieties, religious texts and popular prose, and they were written by adapting the Hebrew script.

Religious texts contained a significantly higher incidence of loanwords from Hebrew and reflected an overall more "educated" style, with many words also from Old French, Provençal, Greek, Aramaic and Latin. The texts include a fragment of a 14th-century poem lauding Queen Esther, and a woman's siddur containing an uncommon blessing, found in few other locations (including medieval Lithuania), thanking God, in the morning blessings, not for making her "according to His will" (שעשני כרצונו she'asani kirtzono) but for making her as a woman.

The extant texts comprising the collections of popular prose used far fewer borrowings and were essentially Occitan written with the Hebrew script. This may have simply reflected Jews' then-prevalent avoidance of the Latin alphabet, which was widely associated with oppressive Christian régimes. The texts demonstrate the extent to which the Jewish community of Provence was familiar with Hebrew as well as the extent to which the community was integrated into the larger surrounding Christian culture of the region.

Phonology
Shuadit had a number of phonological characteristics unlike all other Jewish languages. The name "Shuadit" literally means "Jewish" and is the Occitan pronunciation of the Hebrew word "Yehudit" (initial *j became , and *h was often elided between vowels).

In words inherited from Hebrew, the letters samekh, shin and taw were all pronounced , the same as fe. The conjecture is that the first two  phonemes merged with the  phoneme, which then merged with the phoneme .

Thus, the Provençal words plus, filha, and jutge were respectively pyus, feyo, and šuše in Shuadit.

Evidence

A fundamental source for inferring information about the phonology of Shuadit is the comedy Harcanot et Barcanot. (See Nahon in the References section.)

Emperor Pedro II of Brazil recorded a number of bilingual Hebrew-Shuadit religious poems.

Decline

In 1498, the French Jews were formally expelled from France. Although the community was not finally compelled to depart until 1501, much of the community had by then become dispersed into other regions, notably Genoa, and the underdeveloped regions of Germany. However, the Comtat Venaissin was then under the direct control of the Pope, and a small Jewish community continued to live there in relative isolation. From the time of the French Revolution, when French Jews were permitted to live legally anywhere in France as full citizens, the status of Shuadit began to decline rapidly. The last known native speaker, Armand Lunel, died in 1977.

References

Blondheim, D. S. 1928. Notes étymologiques et lexicographiques. Mélanges de linguistique et de littérature offerts à M. Alfred Jeanroy par ses élèves et ses amis. Paris: Champion. 71-80.
Jochnowitz, G. 1978 "Shuadit: La langue juive de Provence." Archives juives 14: 63-67.
Jochnowitz, G. 2013. "The Hebrew Component in Judeo-Provençal." In Encyclopedia of Hebrew Language and Linguistics, ed. Geoffrey Khan et al., vol. 2, pp. xxxx. Leiden: Brill.
 Link to full-text.
Nahon, P. 2021. "Modern Judeo-Provençal as Known from Its Sole Textual Testimony: Harcanot et Barcanot (Critical Edition and Linguistic Analysis)," Journal of Jewish Languages. doi: https://doi.org/10.1163/22134638-bja10014
Pansier, P. 1925. "Une comédie en argot hébraïco-provençal de la fin du XVIIIe siècle." Revue des études juives 81: 113-145.
Pedro d'Alcantara (Dom Pedro II of Brazil). 1891. Poésies hébraïco-provençales du rituel comtadin. Avignon: Séguin Frères
Zosa Szajkowski, Dos loshn fun di yidn in di arbe kehiles fun Komta-Venesen (The Language of the Jews in the Four Communities of Comtat Venaissin), New York, published by the author and the Yiddish Scientific Institute—YIVO, 1948.

External links
Oxford course on Judeo-Provençal
Jewish Language Research website's page on Judæo-Provençal

Judaeo-French languages
Extinct Romance languages
Provençal language
Languages attested from the 11th century
Languages extinct in the 1970s